Back Branch is a  long 2nd order tributary to the Deep River in Randolph, North Carolina.

Course
Back Branch rises on the Broad Mouth Branch divide about 2 miles northeast of Coleridge, North Carolina in Randolph County, North Carolina and then flows southwesterly to join the Deep River about 0.25 miles north of Coleridge, North Carolina.

Watershed
Back Branch drains  of area, receives about 47.3 in/year of precipitation, and has a wetness index of 388.39 and is about 52% forested.

See also
List of rivers of North Carolina

References

Rivers of North Carolina
Rivers of Randolph County, North Carolina